Charles Léa Eyoum (born 16 January 1951) is a Cameroonian retired professional football player and manager. A forward, he competed for the Cameroon national football team at the 1972 African Cup of Nations.

Club career
Born in Douala, Léa began playing football as a center forward with local side Aigle Nkongsamba. Soon after, he joined Diamant Yaoundé and Canon Yaoundé. He won the 1971 Cameroonian Cup with Diamant Yaoundé and the 1971 African Cup of Champions Clubs title with Canon.

Léa made 52 appearances for the Cameroon national football team from 1969 to 1972.

In 2006, Léa was selected by CAF as one of the best 200 African football players of the last 50 years.

Coaching career
After retiring from playing, Léa became a football manager. He received a coaching license in France and began as a player-manager with D3 side Villemomble Sports in 1978. Next, he returned to Cameroon where he would lead local clubs AS Babimbi, Léopards Douala, Dynamo Douala and Union Douala.

References

External links
 
 Profile at Stade-Rennais-Online

1951 births
Living people
Footballers from Douala
Association football forwards
Cameroonian footballers
Cameroonian expatriate footballers
Cameroon international footballers
1972 African Cup of Nations players
Diamant Yaoundé players
Canon Yaoundé players
Toulouse FC players
US Quevilly-Rouen Métropole players
Stade Rennais F.C. players
Stade Malherbe Caen players
Villemomble Sports players
Ligue 1 players
Cameroonian football managers
Expatriate footballers in France
Cameroonian expatriate sportspeople in France